Mister Magic may refer to:

Music
Mr. Magic (1956–2009), rap and hip-hop pioneer and radio DJ
Mr. Magic (1975–2013), an alternative name for American rapper Magic
Mister Magic, 1975 album by jazz saxophonist Grover Washington, Jr., or the title track composed by Ralph MacDonald and William Slater
Mr. Magico, a character and former member on shock rock band Gwar

Sports
Mr. Magic, also "The Magic Man", nicknames of Swedish ice hockey player Kent Nilsson